Modicisalibacter is a Gram-negative, non-spore-forming, aerobic, moderately halophilic and motile genus from the family of Halomonadaceae, with one known species (Modicisalibacter tunisiensis).

References

Oceanospirillales
Monotypic bacteria genera
Bacteria genera
Taxa described in 2007